Silviatti is a proper Italian surname, originating in the Arno Valley region of Tuscany. The first references to the Silviatti family are in a 1225 census report taken by the town fathers of Sesto di Firenze. They are listed as 'bankers' or 'money-changers' depending upon interpretation of the dialect. Prominent members of the family include Giacopo Silviatti, a majordomo in the house of Lorenzo de' Medici, and Gianfranco Silviatti, an acting mayor of Sesto di Firenze in the 16th century.
The family has remained fairly prominent in the region well into the modern era.

In 1923, the head of the family, Domenico Silviatti, was arrested for vocally protesting the appointment of Benito Mussolini as dictator by King Victor Emmanuel III. Although a political nonentity, Domenico's ongoing ties to the Medici family and Tuscan nobility gave him considerable financial backing and a voice in the region. After being imprisoned for two years, Domenico's wife, Alessandria Pella managed to arrange his release in 1925. The family fled Italy to the United States with the immediate family of one of Domenico's political accomplices, Salvatore De Lorenzo (a distant Medici relative) in 1926, arriving in New York and settling in the Lake Placid area.

The family then faded from prominence for the remainder of the Second World War, but in the mid-1980s, the grandson of Domenico Silviatti, Giancarlo Silviatti (John C. Silviatti) would return the family name to prominence working for the American Express Corporation as the orchestrator of the Shearson Loeb Rhoades purchase, as well as that of the IDS Company. He has since gone into semi-retirement, and has moved from New York to Pennsylvania to supervise the expanding Corporate Benefits Program of the company, specifically the Corporate Travel division, which has a regional headquarters in Luzerne County, Pennsylvania.

Italian families
Surnames